Leslie is an unincorporated community in Greenbrier County, West Virginia, United States. Leslie is located on West Virginia Route 20, southwest of Quinwood.

References

Unincorporated communities in Greenbrier County, West Virginia
Unincorporated communities in West Virginia
Coal towns in West Virginia